Jayne Marion Stinson is an Australian politician. She has been a Labor member of the South Australian House of Assembly since the 2018 state election, representing Badcoe in the inner south-western suburbs of Adelaide.

Stinson worked as a broadcast journalist for ABC News, Network Ten, Channel Seven and media agencies in Cambodia, India and Rwanda before her election. Stinson has also worked for the Law Society of South Australia and as an adviser to the Rudd and Gillard Labor governments.

Stinson was appointed to the front bench upon her election in 2018, taking up the portfolios of Child Protection and Arts. She was later promoted to the Planning and Development and Multicultural Affairs  portfolios, while retaining Arts. She resigned from her portfolios in 2021 for personal reasons. She retained the seat of Badcoe at the March 2022 election.

References

External links
Official website

Members of the South Australian House of Assembly
Year of birth missing (living people)
Living people
Australian Labor Party members of the Parliament of South Australia
Women members of the South Australian House of Assembly
21st-century Australian politicians
21st-century Australian women politicians